Autevielle-Saint-Martin-Bideren is a commune in the Pyrénées-Atlantiques department in the Nouvelle-Aquitaine region of south-western France.

Geography
Autevielle-Saint-Martin-Bideren is located some 20 km south-west of Orthez and 9 km north-east of Saint-Palais. Access to the commune is by road D936 from Abitain in the north which passes through the length of the commune and the village then continues east. The D246 goes west from the village to join the D134 west of the commune. The D140 goes south from the village to Osserain-Rivareyte. The west of the commune is mostly forest while the east is mostly farmland.

The Gave d'Oloron forms the north-western border of the commune as it flows north-west to join the Gave de Pau forming the Gaves réunis at Peyrehorade. The Saison flows through the commune from the south-west and joins the Gave d'Oloron on the north-western border.

Places and hamlets

 Arrécot
 Autevielle
 Les Bains
 Barthou
 Bideren
 Le Bosc
 Le Camou
 Les Campagnes
 Le Château
 Les Gats
 Gerberu
 Hau
 Héouga
 Hyeyte
 L’Île
 Labie
 Laborde
 Lagouardette
 Les Partilles
 Petit
 Saint-Martin

Toponymy
The name Autevielle in béarnais is Autivièla.

The name Bideren in béarnais is Vidèren.

For the name Autevielle Michel Grosclaude proposed two Latin origins: alta villa ("high town") or Altina villa ("Domain of Altinus").

For the name Bideren Michel Grosclaude proposed a probable origin of the man's name Vital with the gascon suffix -enh.

For the name Saint-Martin Michel Grosclaude indicated that it undoubtedly came from the Bishop of Tours - Martin of Tours.

The following table details the origins of the commune name and other names in the commune.

Sources:

Raymond: Topographic Dictionary of the Department of Basses-Pyrenees, 1863, on the page numbers indicated in the table. 
Grosclaude: Toponymic Dictionary of communes, Béarn, 2006 
Cassini: Cassini Map from 1750
EHESS: Bideren page on the EHESS Cassini website

Origins:

Chapter: Chapter of Autevielle
Census: Census of Béarn
Contracts: Contracts retained by Carresse, Notary of Béarn
Reformation: Reformation of Béarn
Denombrement: Denombremont of Gassion
Bayonne: Titles of the Chapter of Bayonne
Insinuations: Insinuations of the Diocese of Oloron 
Military: Military Inspection of Béarn
Béarn: Titles of the Viscounts of Béarn

History
Paul Raymond noted that in 1385 Autevielle and Saint-Martin together had 11 fires with 8 fires at Bideren. They depended on the bailiwick of Sauveterre.

The communes of Autevielle, Saint-Martin, and Bideren merged on 18 April 1842.

Administration

Inter-communality
The commune is part of six inter-communal structures:
 the Communauté de communes du Béarn des Gaves;
 the inter-communal social action centre of Sauveterre-de-Béarn;
 the SIGOM;
 the Energy association of Pyrénées-Atlantiques;
 the inter-communal association for the management of drinking water from the Saleys and the Gaves;
 the inter-communal association of the Gaves and the Saleys;

Demography
In 2017 the commune had 205 inhabitants. The population data given in the table and graph below include the former communes of Saint-Martin and Bideren, absorbed in 1842.

Economy
Economic activity is mainly agricultural. The commune is part of the Appellation d'origine contrôlée (AOC) zone of Ossau-iraty.

Culture and heritage

Religious heritage
The commune has one religious building that is registered as an historical monument:
The Parish Church of Saint Martin (1896)

See also
Communes of the Pyrénées-Atlantiques department

References

External links
Autevielle-Saint-Martin-Bideren on Géoportail, National Geographic Institute (IGN) website 
Haute vielle and Nolivos on the 1750 Cassini Map

Communes of Pyrénées-Atlantiques